Barbara Seppe Ferreira (born December 14, 1996) is an American model and actress. She is best known for her role as Kat Hernandez in the HBO series Euphoria (2019–2022).

Early life 
Ferreira was born in the New York City borough of Queens and later moved to Maywood, New Jersey. She attended Hackensack High School. Ferreira is of Brazilian descent, and was raised by her mother, aunt and grandmother. Her mother and maternal grandmother work as chefs.

Career

Modeling 
As a teenager, Ferreira began her career by sending modeling photos to an American Apparel open casting call. She has since modeled for brands including Aerie, Adidas, Asos, Forever 21, H&M, Missguided, and Target. Unretouched photos and a video interview from Ferreira's Aerie campaign went viral in 2016. Later that year, Time named her among its 2016 "30 Most Influential Teens" list.

Directing 
Ferreira directed the music video for  "So Cool" by Dounia. The video, released in March, 2018, was shot that winter in Connecticut.

Acting 
Ferreira starred in How to Behave, the 10-episode Vice series about etiquette. For this she won a Webby Award for Best Web Personality/Host. She also starred in the Teen Vogue web series Body Party, about body positivity.

In addition, Ferreira played Ella in two episodes of the HBO series Divorce and was among the ensemble stars of the HBO series Euphoria in its first two seasons, playing high-schooler Kat. In August 2022 Ferreira announced she would not return to Euphoria for its third season due to alleged disagreements with series creator Sam Levinson. She made her film debut in Unpregnant (2020) opposite Haley Lu Richardson for HBO Max and had a small role in Jordan Peele’s Nope (2022).

On August 29, 2022, it was announced that Ferreira would join Ariana DeBose in the upcoming Amazon Prime psychological thriller House of Spoils.

Personal life 
Ferreira identifies as queer and has been in a relationship with musician Elle Puckett since 2019.

Filmography

Film

Television

Music videos

Guest appearances

Director

References

External links 
 

1996 births
Living people
20th-century American LGBT people
21st-century American actresses
21st-century American LGBT people
Actresses of Brazilian descent
American people of Brazilian descent
Female models from New York (state)
Hackensack High School alumni
IMG Models models
LGBT actresses
American LGBT actors
Models from New York City
People from Maywood, New Jersey
People from Queens, New York
Plus-size models
LGBT Hispanic and Latino American people
LGBT people from New Jersey
Hispanic and Latino American actresses
Brazilian American